Henriette-Julie de Murat (1668 in Paris – 9 September 1716 in Château de la Buzardière) was an aristocratic French writer of the late 17th century.

Life
She most likely spent most of her childhood in Paris. In 1691 she married Nicholas de Murat, Count de Gilbertez, and beginning in 1692 she frequently attended the salon of the Marquise de Lambert. There she socialized with Marie Catherine d'Aulnoy and Catherine Bernard. In 1697 she published Memoirs of the Countess of M***, a two-volume collection of false "memoirs" which was meant as a response to Charles de Saint-Évremond's 1696 book Memoirs of the Life of Count D*** before his Retirement, which had portrayed women as incapable of virtue and fickle. Murat's book was successful and was even translated into English.

She was one of the leaders of the fairy-tale vogue, along with Marie Catherine d'Aulnoy, Charlotte-Rose de Caumont La Force, Marie-Jeanne Lhéritier, and Charles Perrault. At Marie-Jeanne Lhéritier's insistence, she published three volumes of fairy tales between 1698 and 1699 - Fairy Tales (1698), New Fairy Tales (1698), and Sublime and Allegorical Stories (1699). In 1699 she also published the ghost story A Trip to the Country, and was inducted into the Ricovrati Academy of Padua. Another recognition she received was one of the Academy of Toulouse's Floral Games prizes for excerpts from a volume of her poetry, which is now lost.

In December 1699 she was involved in a scandal when a report was circulated accusing her of "shocking practices and beliefs" including lesbianism. She was estranged from her husband and disinherited by her mother, forced to take a hiatus from publishing, and eventually exiled to the Château de Loches in 1702; in 1701 her debauchery was considered confirmed by the fact that she was pregnant. She tried to escape from the Château de Loches in 1706 wearing men's clothing. She was then transferred to two other prisons before being brought back to the Château de Loches in 1707. In 1709 she obtained partial liberty from the Countess d'Argenton on the condition that she return to her aunt's home.

She wrote a 607-page journal, framed by a letter to her cousin Mademoiselle de Menou.

Her last work was The Sprites of Kernosy Castle, published in 1710.

Works

Fairy tales
 Fairy Tales (1697)
 Le Parfait Amour (Perfect Love)
 Anguillette
 Jeune et Belle (Young and Handsome)
 New Fairy Tales (1698)
 Le Palais de la vengeance (The Palace of Revenge)
 Le Prince des feuilles (The Prince of Leaves)
 Le Bonheur des moineaux (The Happiness of Sparrows), a verse tale
 L'Heureuse Peine (The Fortunate Punishment)
 Le Voyage de campagne (1699)
 Le Père et ses quatre fils (The Father and His Four Sons)
 Sublime and Allegorical Stories (1699)
 Le Roi Porc (The Pig King)
 L'Île de la magnificence (The Island of Magnificence)
 Le Sauvage (The Savage)
 Le Turbot (The Turbot)
 Journal pour Mademoiselle de Menou (1708)
 L'Aigle au beau bec (The Eagle with the Handsome Beak)
 La Fée princesse (The Princess Fairy)
 Peine perdue
 L'Origine du hérisson (The Origin of the Hedgehog)
 An untitled unfinished tale

References

Further reading
 Heidmann, Ute. (2007). "Madame de Murat: Contes (review)". In: Marvels & Tales. 21: 280-283. 10.1353/mat.0.0010.
 Hofmann, Melissa A.. “The Fairy as Hero(ine) and Author: Representations of Female Power in Murat’s “Le Turbot”.” Marvels & Tales 28 (2014): 252 - 277.

External links

 

1668 births
1716 deaths
Collectors of fairy tales
17th-century French women writers
17th-century writers
17th-century French writers
18th-century French women writers
18th-century French writers
French salon-holders
French women short story writers
French short story writers
Women science fiction and fantasy writers
Women folklorists